Elisabeth Aspaker (born 16 October 1962) is a Norwegian politician for the Conservative Party and she is the current county governor of Troms og Finnmark county.  She was also the Minister of European Affairs from 2015-2016 and Minister for Nordic Cooperation from 2013 to 2016. From 2013 to 2015, she also served as Minister of Fisheries.

She was elected to the Norwegian Parliament from Troms in 2005. She previously served as a deputy representative to the Norwegian Parliament during the terms 1989–1993 and 1997–2001.

From 1986 to 1990 she was the deputy leader of the Norwegian Young Conservatives. During the cabinet Syse, she was private secretary (today known as political advisor) in the Ministry of Justice and the Police. During the second cabinet Bondevik, she was appointed political advisor in the Ministry of Education and Research before being promoted to State Secretary in the Ministry of Health and Care Services in 2004.

On the local level she was a member of Harstad municipal council from 1991 to 1995, and of its executive committee from 1999 to 2001. From 1991 to 1999 she was a member of Troms county council, serving as deputy county mayor beginning in 1995.

Before entering politics, she worked as a teacher.

References

External links

Minister of Fisheries Elisabeth Aspaker (homesite at Regjeringen.no)

1962 births
Living people
Conservative Party (Norway) politicians
Members of the Storting
Norwegian state secretaries
Troms politicians
People from Harstad
Government ministers of Norway
Women government ministers of Norway
20th-century Norwegian women politicians
20th-century Norwegian politicians
21st-century Norwegian politicians
21st-century Norwegian women politicians
Women members of the Storting
Norwegian women state secretaries
County governors of Norway